Oceanside Ice Arena is an ice arena and skating center in Tempe, Arizona. Its currently the home of the Desert Youth Hockey Association and formerly hosted Arizona State Sun Devils men's and women's hockey.

Naming
Oceanside's original name was Big Skate to match the adjacent waterpark "Big Surf" and to match the never built tennis court "Big Serve" before it was changed to Oceanside sometime before opening to match the west coast theming of the sports complex.

History
Oceanside Ice Arena opened in 1974. The arena has been home to Desert Youth Hockey Association since 1975 and the Arizona State University hockey program since its inception in 1979.

In 2015 Oceanside went under a $250,000 renovation to help bring the rink up to NCAA standards.

In November 2020, the Arizona Board of Regents' finance committee approved plans to construct a new, 5,000-seat indoor arena on-campus near Desert Financial Arena, which will replace Oceanside as the Sun Devils men's home arena starting in 2022.

On March 16, 2022, the Sun Devil's men's team played their final game at Oceanside, beating the LIU Sharks men's ice hockey team 5-1, the final goal being scored by senior Christopher Grando.

On April 12, 2022, Oceanside and the neighboring water park, Big Surf, were sold to Overton Moore Properties, a real estate developer, putting the rink's future into question.

References

External links
 Oceanside Ice Arena website

Indoor ice hockey venues in the United States
College ice hockey venues in the United States
Arizona State Sun Devils men's ice hockey
Arizona State Sun Devils women's ice hockey